The 1967–68 Durand Cup Final was the 63rd final of the Durand Cup, the oldest football competition in India, and was contested between Kolkata giant East Bengal and Bengal Nagpur Railway on 11 January 1968 at the Corporation Stadium in New Delhi.

East Bengal won the final 1–0 to claim their 5th Durand Cup title. Mohammed Habib scored the only goal in the final as East Bengal lifted their fifth Durand Cup title.

Route to the final

Match

Summary
The Durand Cup final began at the Corporation Stadium in New Delhi on 11 January 1968 in front of a packed crowd as Kolkata giant East Bengal and faced Bengal Nagpur Railway. East Bengal reached their sixth Durand Cup final after defeating Hyderabad City Police 1–0 in the semi-final, having won the tournament previously in 1951, 1952, 1956, and 1960. Bengal Nagpur Railway made their maiden appearance in the final after they defeated Leaders Club 3–2 in the semi-final. 

The game started steadily with both teams being cautious in the first fifteen minutes. East Bengal, being the favourites, started dominating the game and the likes of K. Sharma, Ashim Bose and Sunil Bhattacharya all made attempts at the B. N. R. goal but could not break the deadlock. East Bengal made a substitution at halftime as S. Sarkar replaced Afzal and the change made an immediate impact on the game as S. Sarkar put a measured cross for Mohammed Habib who could not connect properly. The deadlock was finally broken in the fifty-sixth minute as Habib found the winner with a header to make it 1–0 for East Bengal. B. N. R. tried to make a comeback in the game after conceding the goal but the East Bengal defence dealt with the attacks and managed to hold onto the lead till full-time as East Bengal lifted their fifth Durand Cup title.

Details

References

External links
Durand Cup Finals

Durand Cup finals
1967–68 in Indian football
East Bengal Club matches
Football competitions in Kolkata